The 2015 Big East Conference baseball tournament will be held at TD Ameritrade Park in Omaha, Nebraska, from May 21 through 24. The event, held at the end of the conference regular season, determines the champion of the Big East Conference for the 2015 season.  The winner of the double-elimination tournament will receive the conference's automatic bid to the 2015 NCAA Division I baseball tournament.

Format and seeding
The tournament will use a double-elimination format and feature the top four finishers of the Big East's seven teams.

Bracket

References

Tournament
Big East Conference Baseball Tournament
Big East Conference baseball tournament
Big East Conference baseball tournament
College sports tournaments in Nebraska
Baseball competitions in Omaha, Nebraska